Hoang Mai (born June 14, 1973) is a Canadian politician, who served as a New Democratic Party Member of Parliament for Brossard—La Prairie from 2011 to 2015.

Early life
Mai studied pure science and economics before completing his bachelor's degree in law and a master's degree in international private law with a notary option from the Université de Montréal in 1996. He then trained in international law in The Hague. In 1998 he joined an international law office which took him to work in Vietnam, Singapore and Hong Kong before returning to Montreal in 2001. Since 2002, Hoang has been a notary in private practice.

Mai ran in Brossard—La Prairie in the 2008 federal election, but lost to Liberal candidate Alexandra Mendès. He was elected in the 2011 Canadian federal election, defeating Mendès. Born in Montreal to Vietnamese immigrant parents, he and caucus colleague Anne Minh-Thu Quach were the second and third people of Vietnamese descent, following Ève-Mary Thaï Thi Lac, ever elected to the House of Commons of Canada.

Shortly after the election Mai was named to the official opposition shadow cabinet as critic for National Revenue. He was also the first Vice-Chair of the Standing Committee on Finance (FINA) in the House of Commons. In January 2013, he was named Deputy Critic for Justice and began to sit on the Justice and Human rights committee. In March 2014, he was named the Official Opposition Transport critic, replacing Olivia Chow, who resigned and campaigned to become Mayor of Toronto.

He was member of the Canada-Vietnam and Canada-China parliamentary associations.

In the 2015 federal election, Mai ran for re-election in the newly created riding of Brossard—Saint-Lambert, again facing off against Mendès, who defeated him.

Electoral record

References

External links

1974 births
Canadian politicians of Vietnamese descent
Living people
Members of the House of Commons of Canada from Quebec
New Democratic Party MPs
People from Brossard
Politicians from Montreal
Université de Montréal alumni
21st-century Canadian politicians